Vallejos is a Spanish-language surname, roughly meaning "little valleys". Notable people with the surname include:

Carlos Vallejos Sologuren (born 1940), Peruvian physician and politician
Catalina Vallejos (born 1989), Chilean television personality
Daniel Vallejos (born 1981), Costa Rican footballer
Fabiana Vallejos (born 1985), Argentine women's footballer
Leopoldo Vallejos (born 1944), Chilean retired footballer
Roque Vallejos (1943-2006), Paraguayan poet
Tomás Vallejos (born 1984), Argentine rugby union player

See also
Vallejo (surname)
Vallejos (disambiguation)

Spanish-language surnames